Group Sex may refer to:

Group sex, sexual activity involving more than two participants
Group Sex (album), by Circle Jerks, 1980
Group Sex/Wild in the Streets, a compilation album, 1988
Group Sex (film), 2010